St. Ann's High School is a private, Roman Catholic school for girls in Secunderabad, Telangana, India. It was established on 1 April 1871 and is affiliated to the ICSE/ISC board, Council for the Indian School Certificate Examinations.

Notable alumni 

 Diana Hayden, Miss World 1997, actress and model
 Ananda Shankar Jayant, classical dancer, choreographer, scholar and bureaucrat
 Jayathi Murthy, dean of the UCLA Henry Samueli School of Engineering and Applied Science
 Smita Sabharwal, IAS officer
 Sushmita Sen, actress and model
 Rakesh Sharma, First Indian Astronaut in space.
 Shantha Sinha, activist
 Tania Soni, beauty pageant titleholder
 Vasuki Sunkavalli, lawyer and model
 Tabu, actress

References

External links 
 

Schools in Secunderabad
Private schools in Hyderabad, India
High schools and secondary schools in Hyderabad, India
Christian schools in Telangana
Girls' schools in Telangana
Educational institutions established in 1871
1871 establishments in India